James or Jimmy O'Neill may refer to:

 James O'Neill (actor, born 1847) (1847–1920), father of the playwright Eugene O'Neill
 James O'Neill (actor, born 1863) (1863–1938), vaudeville and early film actor
 James E. O'Neill (1929–1987), American acting Archivist for the National Archives
 James O'Neill (baseball) (died 1993), winner of College World Series Most Outstanding Player award in 1952
 James O'Neill (New Zealand politician) (1819–1882)
 James O'Neill (Washington politician) (1824–1913), American politician in Oregon and Washington states
 James O'Neill (priest) (died 1922), founder of the Knights of Saint Columbanus
 James O'Neill (jurist) (1847–1929), American jurist and politician
 James O'Neill (Wisconsin settler) (1810–1882), American settler, politician, and sawmill owner
 James Ryan O'Neill (born 1947), Australian serial killer
 Jimmy O'Neill (footballer, born 1931) (1931–2007), Irish international footballer
 James P. O'Neill (born 1950s), New York City police commissioner
 James R. O'Neill (1833–1863), American Civil War artist and correspondent
 Jamie O'Neill (born 1962), Irish author
 Tip O'Neill (baseball) (1860–1915), Canadian Baseball Hall of Fame inductee
 James Hugh O'Neill (1892–1972), American Catholic priest
 James E. O'Neill Jr. (1929–2002), Michigan politician

See also
 Jim O'Neill (disambiguation)
 James A. O'Neil (1800–1874), American politician in Oregon
 James O'Neil Mayne (died 1939), Australian philanthropist
 James O'Neal, pseudonym of writer James O. Born
 James Neal (disambiguation)